Poropuntius tawarensis is a species of cyprinid fish. It endemic to Lake Tawar in Aceh Province, northern Sumatra, Indonesia.

Sources

tawarensis
Freshwater fish of Indonesia
Fish described in 1916
Taxonomy articles created by Polbot